Gerard Somer (born 24 November 1943) is a retired Dutch football defender and later manager.

References

1941 births
Living people
Dutch footballers
Go Ahead Eagles players
SBV Vitesse players
Heracles Almelo players
Eredivisie players
Association football defenders
Dutch football managers
Heracles Almelo managers